An intimate part, personal part or private part is a place on the human body which is customarily kept covered by clothing in public venues and conventional settings, as a matter of fashion and cultural norms. In several cultures, revealing these parts is seen as a religious offence.

Definitions vary, but usually they are primarily the parts involved in sexual arousal, procreation, and elimination of excreta and related matter, including:
for both sexes: the buttocks, anus, perineum, mons pubis, crotch, pubic hair, and groin
for males: the penis and scrotum
for females: the vulva (including pudendal cleft), vagina, breasts, nipples, and cleavage (breasts)

The term intimate parts may be construed to mean only the external body parts that are visible when naked, rather than the body parts more commonly referred to. For example, when naked, a woman's pudendal cleft is predominantly visible rather than the vagina, and a man's scrotum is visible rather than the testes which are contained within.

Female breasts are considered as parts that would be covered in most contexts but with a degree of tolerance for toplessness varying in different regions and cultures. For example, Fischtein, Herold and Desmarais (2005) found that acceptance of toplessness in a sample of Canadians varied depending on both personal factors (such as the respondent's gender, age, and religion) and contextual factors (i.e. toplessness in streets, parks, or beaches).

In some periods of European history, female shoulders and legs may have been considered intimate parts. More conservative viewpoints in the West in some contexts still find it appropriate that females should cover their shoulders, particularly when entering a church or other sacred space.

In Islamic traditions, the definition of awrah is similar to the definition of intimate parts in Western culture. The extent of cover for the female body depends upon the situation, but may include the hair, shoulders, and neck in addition to the aforementioned "intimate parts". A majority of scholars agree that the entire body except the face and hands should be covered in public or in front of unrelated non-Muslim women and in front of unrelated men. The exceptions are the scholars from Hanafi school of thought, which has the largest number of followers, which agree that the feet are not part of the awrah and therefore may be revealed. For males, most scholars regard all parts of body from the navel to the knees as awrah.

The intentional exposure of one's intimate parts is a form of exhibitionism. Such exposure may be subject to strict social rules, social control and even criminal justice, if it is considered to be a form of indecent exposure. The unintentional exposure of intimate parts (as in the case of a "wardrobe malfunction") may be connected with feelings of shame.

Intentionally touching the intimate parts of another person, even through clothing, is often associated with sexual intent. If this is done without the consent of the person being touched, it is considered groping or in some cases sexual harassment or sexual assault.

Naturism is a lifestyle choice that is characterized by the practice of nudity both alone and in groups. Some naturists hold that nakedness is not automatically a sexual state and that covering areas of the body is merely a social construct: they believe that the norms of society can be upheld even when all are nude.

See also

 Erogenous zone
 Intimate parts in Islam
 Public nudity
 Secondary sex characteristic
 Sex organ
 Taboo

References

English-language idioms
Modesty
Sexual anatomy
Social constructionism
Human surface anatomy
Nudity